Propargyl bromide, also known as 3-bromo-prop-1-yne, is an organic compound with the chemical formula HC≡CCH2Br. A colorless liquid, it is a halogenated organic compound consisting of propyne with a bromine substituent on the methyl group. It has a lachrymatory effect, like related compounds.  The compound is used as a reagent in organic synthesis.

Applications and production
Propargyl bromide can also be used as an intermediate for the synthesis of organic compounds, including agrochemicals and pharmaceuticals. In the 1960s, it was used in a soil fumigant called Trizone.

Propargyl bromide may be produced by the treatment of propargyl alcohol with phosphorus tribromide.

Reactions 
Propargyl bromide is an alkylating agent. With dimethylsulfide, it reacts to give the sulfonium salt:

It also alkylates even weakly basic amines such as aniline.

Aldehydes react with propargyl bromide in a Barbier-type reaction to yield alkynyl alcohols:

At low temperatures, upon treatment with magnesium, propargyl bromide gives the Grignard reagent formally derived from allenyl bromide, i.e., CH2=C=CHMgBr.

Safety
Propargyl bromide is a lachrymator and an alkylating agent.

See also 
Propargyl
Propargyl chloride
Propargyl alcohol
Allyl bromide

References

Organobromides
Propargyl compounds